Venkataraghavan Ranganathan, better known as Raaghav on screen, is an Indian actor and television personality in Tamil Nadu. Before his break into films, he appeared in season 1  of Jodi Number One.

Career
He first appeared in supporting roles in several films, he made his debut as the lead hero with, Nanjupuram. He is a gold medalist from College of Engineering, Guindy, Chennai and passed out in 1994. He then went on to further his studies in the University of Illinois and later came back to Chennai, where he worked as a software engineer. But due to his passion for media, he shifted to a career of acting.

He married his TV co-star Preetha. He and his wife appeared together in Jodi Number 1 in STAR Vijay and Maanada Mayilada in Kalaignar TV. In both the reality shows they were the 1st runner up.

Filmography

Television
Serials

Shows

References

External links
 
 Raaghav on Facebook
 BBC World TV Live Interview with 'TICKET' Team - director/actor Raaghav Ranganathan and producer Preetha S - June 20, 2017
 Perception of Tamil Cinema is eclipsed by Bollywood - Raaghav Ranganathan's interview in 'The Statesman' Newspaper, 22 July 2017

Indian male film actors
21st-century Tamil male actors
University of California, Berkeley alumni
Living people
1981 births
21st-century Indian male actors
Tamil male television actors
Tamil television presenters
Tamil Reality dancing competition contestants
Male actors in Tamil cinema
Tamil film score composers
Tamil film directors
University of Illinois alumni